The Housing Act 1996 is an Act of Parliament in the United Kingdom. Part VII of the Act concerns the duties that a local authority has to homeless people and when these duties arise. Section 189 of the Act concerns the "priority need" hurdle that a homelessness application must pass for a Council to have a duty to provide interim accommodation.

See also
Homelessness Act 2002

References

External links
Legislation

United Kingdom Acts of Parliament 1996
Homelessness and law
Homelessness in the United Kingdom
Housing legislation in the United Kingdom